Rhodohypoxis baurii, the red star or rosy posy, is a species of flowering plant in the family Hypoxidae
that is native to damp meadows in eastern South Africa. The upturned flowers are held on slender, short straight stalks. The tepals are of equal length and held alternately in two ranks.

The specific epithet baurii is named for Reverend L. R. Baur (1825-1889), who collected Rhodohypoxis in South Africa.

Cultivation
It prefers a peaty, acid soil which stays reliably moist in summer but dries out in winter to ensure a suitable dormant period. 
The necessary conditions may be achieved in a pot or trough, or by planting it in peat pockets. Propagation is by seed or division. Many cultivars have been developed for ornamental garden use. Most are larger-flowered and more vigorous than the species. Cultivar names include ‘Apple Blossom’, ‘Dawn’, ‘Emily Peel’ and ‘Susan Garnett-Bottfield’. 

Rhodohypoxis baurii has gained the Royal Horticultural Society’s Award of Garden Merit.

References

Hypoxidaceae
Flora of South Africa